The Gaithersburg Police Department (GPD) is the municipal police force of Gaithersburg, Maryland.

History

1963–1986: Founding
The Gaithersburg Police Department was founded on April 1, 1963, when a resolution creating it was signed into law by the mayor of the city at the time, Merton F. Duvall.

The town budget for fiscal year 1964 included "police protection" salaries for the solitary officer amounting to $4,000 (equivalent to $ today), and equipment purchases of $500 (equivalent to $ today).

It was under the administration of Chief DeVries that the Gaithersburg city police began to operate under its current system of dispatch through the Montgomery County Police Department. As a former Montgomery County Police lieutenant, DeVries was in a position to work with the County Police in a way that had previously not been possible.

1986–1998: Expansion and modernization
The Gaithersburg Police Department grew from an authorized strength of three sworn officers and one civilian clerk in the early 1970s, when the city's population was 7,000, to its current complement of 57 sworn officers and nine civilians. The majority of that growth occurred from 1986 to 1998 under the direction of then-chief Mary Ann Viverette.

In 1983, the GPD formed a traffic unit.

Viverette was the GPD's chief from 1986 until her retirement in May 2007. John King succeeded Viverette and served until 2010. The GPD currently falls under the leadership of Mark P. Sroka.

Organization

Personnel
From 1971 to 1990, the Gaithersburg Police Department only hired officers who had former experience as police officers.

The majority of the Gaithersburg's police officers have come from other agencies. The experience of these officers comes from agencies such as Montgomery County, Washington, D.C., United States Secret Service, Montgomery County Sheriff's Office, Maryland National Capital Police, and Baltimore City, to name a few.

Chiefs
David Marstiller was the first Chief of Police, although there are references to a "Town Marshall" in the minutes of Town Council Meetings prior to 1963.

Over the years, there would be several chiefs of police; James Tassie, formerly of the Rockville City Police Department; Marson Johnson, who had been an officer in Michigan; John F. DeVries and George Fusco, both of whom had retired from the Montgomery County Police Department as lieutenants.

List of chiefs

See also 

Rockville City Police Department

References

External links

1963 establishments in Maryland
Municipal police departments of Maryland
Police